Timofei Konstantinovich Tszyu (born 2 November 1994) is an Australian professional boxer who held the Australian light-middleweight title in 2019 and is currently ranked No.1 Australia light-middleweight and has held the WBO interim light middleweight title since 2023. by BoxRec. He is the son of former light welterweight world champion of boxing, Kostya Tszyu and older brother of Nikita Tszyu. A portrait of Tszyu by Ksenija Hrnjak was a finalist for the 2022 Archibald Prize.

Early life
Tszyu was born in Sydney, New South Wales, to Russian parents. His father Kostya is of ethnic Russian, Korean and Mongolian descent and his mother Natasha Anikina is of ethnic Russian descent. His father, Kostya, is a former undisputed light-welterweight champion who was inducted into the International Boxing Hall of Fame in 2011. Tim's first sporting interest began to develop at the age of six when enrolled in gymnastics and later switched sports to association football at the age of 10. As a soccer player, he was selected to play for multiple local representative teams but his interest in the sport began to wane at the age of 13 when he temporarily relocated to Moscow with his family for a few months before returning to Sydney. At the age of 15, Tszyu decided to quit football and began pursuing a career in boxing. He attended St George Christian School and Newington College throughout his teenage years and enrolled in a business degree at the University of Technology Sydney following high school graduation. His brother, Nikita, is also a professional boxer.

Tszyu amassed an amateur boxing record of 33–1 before turning professional in 2016 at the age of 22.

Professional boxing career

Tszyu vs. Cassidy 
After being away from the sport for four years due to a hand injury, Tszyu made his professional debut in December 2016 when he defeated Zorran Cassidy by unanimous decision (UD) at the Sydney Cricket Ground.

Tszyu vs. Ryan 
He won the WBC-ABCO Continental light-middleweight title in his seventh bout, with a UD over Wade Ryan.

Tszyu vs. Brubaker 
In November 2019, Tszyu defeated Jack Brubaker by technical knockout (TKO) in the fourth round.

Tszyu vs. Horn 
On 26 August 2020, he defeated former WBO welterweight champion Jeff Horn via eighth-round corner stoppage at the Queensland Country Bank Stadium.

Tszyu vs. Hogan 
On 31 March 2021, Tszyu, ranked #9 by The Ring, #1 by the WBO, #3 by the IBF, #7 by the WBA and #11 by the WBC fought Dennis Hogan who was ranked #10 by the WBC. Tszyu beat Hogan via a fifth-round TKO.

Tszyu vs. Spark 
In his next bout, Tszyu fought and defeated Steve Spark via a third-round TKO.

Tszyu vs. Inoue 
In his next bout, Tszyu fought and defeated a very resilient Takeshi Inoue, with a convincing unanimous decision win, winning on all three scorecards, 120-107, 120-107 and 119-108.

Tszyu vs. Gausha 
In his next bout, Tszyu defeated 2012 Olympian Terrell Gausha in his first fight in America at The Armory in Minneapolis. After suffering a first round knockdown, Tszyu recovered and dominated from the 2nd round to win convincingly by unanimous decision, 114-113, 116-111 and 115-112.

Tszyu vs. Harrison 
On 22 January 2023 it was announced Tim Tszyu will be taking on former WBC 154-lb champion Tony Harrison for the interim WBO junior middleweight title on 12 March in Australia. He won the fight by 9th round TKO.

Professional boxing record

Titles in boxing
Regional Titles
WBC-ABCO Continental light-middleweight title
WBA Oceania interim light-middleweight title
Australian light-middleweight title
IBF Australasian light-middleweight title
WBO Global light-middleweight title
Commonwealth light-middleweight title
WBO Asia Pacific light-middleweight title
WBO Interim Junior Middleweight World Champion

References

External links

Tim Tszyu - Profile, News Archive & Current Rankings at Box.Live

1994 births
Living people
Australian people of Russian descent
Australian people of Korean descent
Australian people of Mongolian descent
Australian male boxers
Boxers from Sydney
People educated at Newington College
Sportsmen from New South Wales
Light-middleweight boxers